Hamilton Boys' High School is a boys' secondary school in Hamilton, New Zealand and is the largest secondary school in the Waikato region. The school was established as Hamilton High School in 1911 but was later split into separate boys' and girls' schools, with the current school opened in February 1955. Its sister school is Hamilton Girls' High School. The school crest features a lion, sash and star, and bears the motto "Sapiens Fortunam Fingit Sibi" which translates to "a wise man carves his own fortune". The school colours are black and red.

Most of the school's approximately 2100 students are day boys from Hamilton and surrounding townships such as Cambridge, Te Awamutu, and Morrinsville. Around 170 boys are housed in an onsite boarding hostel, Argyle House, which forms one of the six houses into which the school is divided.  The boarding house is located on the school grounds, but is essentially a private institution, with students paying approximately $14,000 per year to attend.

In 1999, the school appointed Susan Hassall to head the school. In doing so the school became one of the first boys' schools in New Zealand to appoint a female headmaster.

Academic 
The school offers both the state run NCEA and external Cambridge International Examinations for students to undertake.

Sport 

In rugby, Hamilton Boys’ High School has the best record in New Zealand at the National 1st XV.  It has also won the international Sanix World Rugby Youth Invitational Tournament more than any other school.

Hamilton Boys’ High School has won the Maadi Cup for rowing eights 11 times (and holds the record for the fastest time), and the Springbok Shield for fours 16 times.

Hamilton Boys' High School competes as part of the Super Eight group of boys' high schools from eight provincial cities in the central North Island of New Zealand. Their 1st XV Rugby team has won the Super Eight Rugby 1st XV competition twelve times, as of 2019.

Houses 
Hamilton Boys' High School currently has six houses. All of the day boy houses (all houses except Argyle House) are named after former headmasters of the school.
 Tait - Red
 Taylor - Green
 Wilson - Blue
 Steel - Grey
 Baigent - Yellow
 Argyle - Black

After every House competition, the new scores will be added to the previous scores. The House with the highest number of points at the end of the year gets to have its House name on the yearly House win list. No House has won more than twice consecutively.

Enrolment 
Like all previously selective state schools, Hamilton Boys' High School operates an enrolment scheme.

Enrolment was traditionally by academic examination followed by an interview. Alternatively a student might be enrolled if he had a family connection to the school. The school still examines new students but only for the purposes of streaming students.

Notable alumni

As well as a number of All Blacks and All Whites, the following people are Old Boys of Hamilton Boys' High School:

The Arts 
 Vincent Burke - film producer
 Daniel Gillies - actor
 Tony Martin - Australian-based comedian and writer
 Frank Sargeson - author
 Stan Walker - winner of Australian Idol

Public Service 
 Sir Colin Allan - former Governor of Seychelles
 Air Vice-Marshal Graham Lintott - Chief of the Royal New Zealand Air Force
 The Hon. John Luxton - Cabinet Minister 1990-1999
 Dr Shane Reti MP - MP and deputy leader, NZ National Party

Sport 
 Craig Baird - multiple New Zealand and Australian motorsport champion
 Aled de Malmanche - former Chiefs (rugby union), Waikato Rugby Union and NZ All Black, now playing for Stade Français in France.
 Warren Gatland - former Waikato Rugby Union player and coach, coached the Wales national rugby union team from 2008 to 2019, former NZ All Black
 Daryl Halligan - ARL football player and TV commentator
 Ron Hemi - head boy at HBHS, former NZ All Black
 Tawera Kerr-Barlow - former New Zealand national under-20 rugby union team, Waikato Rugby Union, Chiefs (rugby union) and All Black player
Josh Lord - current New Zealand All Black
 Scott McLeod - former NZ All Black
 Sean Maitland - former New Zealand national under-20 rugby union team, Canterbury Rugby Football Union, Crusaders (rugby union), Glasgow Warriors and current Saracens and Scottish Rugby Union player. Also played in the 2013 British & Irish Lions tour to Australia
 David Nyika - boxer
 Richard Petherick - current New Zealand Black Stick
 Dick Quax - Olympic Games silver medallist, 1976 5,000 metres and later world record holder 5,000m, Auckland City councillor
 Sam Rapira - Former New Zealand Warriors player and New Zealand national rugby league team representative
 Trent Renata - Former Waikato Rugby Union and New Zealand national under-20 rugby union team, current Otago and Highlanders player
 Jake Robertson - Commonwealth games 5,000m and 10,000m finalist, 2014
 Zane Robertson - Olympic Games 10,000m finalist, 2016
 Mitchell Santner - current all-rounder for the New Zealand national cricket team.
 Aaron Scott - former All White NZ football player
 Henry Speight - former Waikato and current ACT Brumbies player
 Scott Styris - former New Zealand Black Caps cricket player
 Dwayne Sweeney - Former Waikato, Chiefs Player, now plays rugby in Japan.
Quinn Tupaea - current New Zealand All Black
 Chris van der Drift - former driver for New Zealand A1GP motor racing team
 BJ Watling - current New Zealand Black Caps cricket player
 Jackson Willison - Former New Zealand national under-20 rugby union team, Chiefs (rugby union) and Current Waikato Rugby Union, Blues (Super Rugby) and Māori All Blacks player
Sevu Reece - current New Zealand All Black

Other 
 Peter James Bethune - anti-whaling activist

Headmasters

See also
Hamilton Girls' High School

References

External links 
 hbhs.School.nz – Official website

Boarding schools in New Zealand
Boys' schools in New Zealand
Cambridge schools in New Zealand
Educational institutions established in 1911
Secondary schools in Hamilton, New Zealand
1911 establishments in New Zealand